Independent Dream Machine is an Allentown, Pennsylvania-based production company founded by film producer James C. Zelker in 1997. Past feature film include Affairs (1997), A.K.A.: It's a Wiley World! (2003), Fading (2003), (2005) and InSearchOf (2009).

External links
 Company web site
 Indiewire Report
 Moviemaker
 Independent feature film FADING to screen at Roxy in PA!
 VIDEO: "Loggerheads"

Film production companies of the United States
Companies based in Allentown, Pennsylvania
American companies established in 1997
1997 establishments in Pennsylvania